The Harrylock Formation is a geologic formation in Ireland. It preserves fossils dating back to the Devonian period.

See also

 List of fossiliferous stratigraphic units in Ireland

References
 

Geologic formations of Ireland
Devonian System of Europe
Devonian Ireland